The Beggar Prince is a lost 1920 film directed by William Worthington and produced by Sessue Hayakawa's Haworth Pictures Corporation.

Plot
An island is ruled by a prince (Sessue Hayakawa) who mistakenly believes he can control the moon and the sea. The prince tries to be with a beautiful girl (Batrice La Plante) who doesn't like him. A fisherman (also played by Sessue Hayakawa) sees the prince harassing the girl and knocks him out and swaps clothes with him and takes over the role as leader of the country. After some time the fisherman feels guilty and returns the throne to the cast out prince. The prince has found a peaceful way of life and both men marry the women they love.

Cast
Sessue Hayakawa as Nikki/Prince
Beatrice La Plante as Olala
Thelma Percy as Sosad
Bert Hadley as Grand Vizier
Robert Bolder as Bunko
Josef Swickard as Nodo 
Charles A. Post as Court Murderer (*as Buddy Post)

References

External links

1920 films
Haworth Pictures Corporation films
Films directed by William Worthington
American black-and-white films
American silent feature films
Lost American films
1920 comedy films
Silent American comedy films
Film Booking Offices of America films
1920 lost films
Lost comedy films
1920s American films
Films with screenplays by Richard Schayer